Nestlé-Wyeth Nutrition (formerly owned by Pfizer after the acquisition of Wyeth in 2009) provides food products to meet the needs of infants, young children and adults. Through scientific research, they claim to help nourish children  when breastfeeding is not an option. Wyeth Nutrition started in 1915 when Henry Grestberger manufactured the first formula patterned after breast milk called SMA (synthetic milk adaptive). Wyeth Pharmaceuticals, formerly Wyeth-Ayerst Laboratories, is the original company founded by the Wyeth brothers, originally known as John Wyeth and Brother. They focused on the research, development, and marketing of prescription drugs. The pharmaceuticals division was further subdivided into five subdivisions: Wyeth Research, Prescription Products, Biotech, Vaccines, and Nutritionals. Wyeth's research and development director Robert Ruffolo was quoted in The New York Times about the firm's efforts to develop new drugs.

Acquisition by Nestlé

Notes and references

Nestlé